Estadio Jorge Leonidas García is a football stadium in Trujillo, Honduras.  It is currently used mostly for football matches and is the home stadium of Unión Ájax.  The stadium holds 4,000 people.

References 

Jorge Leonidas Garcia